Sivry may refer to:

People
 Auguste-Louis de Sivry, 19th century French art collector and dealer

Places
 Sivry-Rance, Belgium
 , a submunicipality
 Sivry, Meurthe-et-Moselle, France
 Sivry (Saisy), Saône-et-Loire, France
 Sivry-Ante, Marne, France
 Sivry-Courtry, Seine-et-Marne, France
 Sivry-Rance, Hainaut, Belgium
 Sivry-la-Perche, Meuse, France
 Sivry-sur-Meuse, Meuse, France